From Across the Street is the sixth stand-up comedy album by Doug Stanhope, released on November 24, 2009 by Stand Up! Records.  It was recorded live on August 11, 2009 at Level 5 at City Stage in Wilmington, North Carolina.

Track listing
"Funny Thing About Child Porn" - 1:18
"Blog This!" - 3:14
"You Ruined The Man Show" - 2:26
"A Reputation For Violence" - 3:27
"You Get What You Deserve" - 3:41
"Preventative Medicine" - 2:43
"Dominatrix Health Care" - 4:51
"Suicidal Species" - 2:24
"For Only Two Dollars a Month You Can Keep This Kid Alive Long Enough To Produce Six More People Who Have Nothing To Eat" - 4:24
"Monogamy" - 5:21
"Don't Talk To Strangers" - 8:22
"Steve Fossett - Adventurer!" - 5:12
"Goodnite, Clark Adams" - 7:13
"Bonus" - 3:09

External links
 Doug Stanhope's official website
 Doug Stanhope's MySpace Page
 Stand Up! Records

2009 albums
Doug Stanhope albums
Stand Up! Records live albums
2000s comedy albums